Little Lise (French: La petite Lise) is a 1930 French drama film directed by Jean Grémillon and starring Nadia Sibirskaïa. It was shot at the Joinville Studios of Pathé in Paris. The film's sets were designed by Guy de Gastyne.

Cast
 Pierre Alcover as Victor Berthier  
 Joe Alex as Le danseur noir  
 Alex Bernard as Un client de Lise  
 Julien Bertheau as André  
 Raymond Cordy as Un joueur de billiard  
 Lucien Hector as Un bagnard  
 Alexandre Mihalesco as L'usurier  
 Pierre Piérade as M. Bazet  
 Nadia Sibirskaïa as Lise Berthier 
 Ernest Léardée as Le violoniste dans la rue

References

Bibliography 
 Andrews, Dudley. Mists of Regret: Culture and Sensibility in Classic French Film. Princeton University Press, 1995.

External links 
 

1930 films
1930s French-language films
Films directed by Jean Grémillon
French black-and-white films
1930 drama films
French drama films
Films set in Paris
Films shot in Paris
Films shot at Joinville Studios
1930s French films